This is the discography of the record label Thrill Jockey

thrill 543 - Elena Setién - Unfamiliar Minds (2022)
thrill 528 - Sally Anne Morgan - Thread (2020)
thrill 520 - Rose City Band - Rose City Band (2020)
thrill 518 - Helen Money - Arriving Angels (2019)
thrill 517 - Sightless Pit - Grave of a Dog (2020)
thrill 515 - Oval - Eksploio (2019)
thrill 514 - Oval - Scis (2020)
thrill 510 - Wrekmeister Harmonies - We Love To Look at the Carnage (2020)
thrill 509 - OOIOO - Nijimusi (2020)
thrill 508 - Dan Friel - Fanfare (2019)
thrill 507 - Emptyset - Blossoms (2019)
thrill 506 - The Body - Remixed (2019)
thrill 505 - Lightning Bolt - Sonic Citadel   (2019)
thrill 504 - Lightning Bolt - Oblivion Hunter (2019)
thrill 503 - Lightning Bolt - Earthly Delights (2019)
thrill 501 - Lightning Bolt - Wonderful Rainbow (2019)
thrill 499 - Lightning Bolt - Ride the Skies (2019)
thrill 498 - Lightning Bolt - Lightning Bolt (2020)
thrill 497 - Charles Rumback & Ryley Walker - Little Common Twist (2019)
thrill 496 - Black To Comm - Before After (2019)
thrill 495 - Umberto - Helpless Spectator (2019)
thrill 494 - Alexander Tucker - Guild of the Asbestos Weaver (2019)
thrill 493 - Eye Flys - Context (2019)
thrill 492 - Sequoyah Murray - Before You Begin (2019)
thrill 491 - Sequoyah Murray - Penalties of Love (2019)
thrill 490 - Aseethe - Throes (2019)
thrill 489 - Martin Brandlmayr - Vive Les Fantômes (2019)
thrill 488 - Jan St. Werner - Glottal Wolpertinger (2019)
thrill 487 - Dommengang - No Keys (2019)
thrill 486 - House and Land - Across the Field (2019)
thrill 485 - ENDON - Boy Meets Girl (2019)
thrill 484 - Fox Millions Duo - Biting Through (2019)
thrill 483 - Sarah Louise - Nighttime Birds and Morning Stars (2019)
thrill 482 - Matmos - Plastic Anniversary (2019)
thrill 481 - Black To Comm - Seven Horses For Seven Kings (2019)
thrill 480 - Colleen - Babies (2002)
thrill 479 - Colleen - Les Ondes Silencieuses (2007)
thrill 478 - Colleen - Colleen et les Boîtes à Musique (2006)
thrill 477 - Colleen - The Golden Morning Breaks (2005)
thrill 476 - Colleen - Everyone Alive Wants Answers (2003)
thrill 475 - BEAST - Ens (2018)
thrill 474 (single) - Elena Setién - Wreckage of The Hunt (2019)
thrill 474 - Elena Setién - Another Kind Of Revolution (2019)
thrill 473 - Oozing Wound - High Anxiety (2019)
thrill 472 - Upper Wilds - Mars (2018)
thrill 471 - Thalia Zedek Band - Fighting Season (2018)
thrill 470 - SUMAC - Love in Shadow (2018)
thrill 469 - Alexander Tucker - Don’t Look Away (2018)
thrill 468 - Glenn Jones - The Giant Who Ate Himself and Other New Works for 6 & 12 String Guitar (2018)
thrill 467 - Brendon Anderegg - June (2018)
thrill 466 - Marisa Anderson - Cloud Corner (2018)
thrill 465 - John Parish - Bird Dog Dante (2018)
thrill 464 - Wooden Shjips - V. (2018)
thrill 463 - Keiji Haino & SUMAC - American Dollar Bill – Keep Facing Sideways, You're Too Hideous to Look at Face On (2018)
thrill 462 - E - Negative Work (2018)
thrill 461 - Mouse on Mars - Dimensional People (2018)
thrill 460 - The Body - I Have Fought Against It, but I Can't Any Longer. (2018)
thrill 459 - The Sea and Cake - Any Day (2018)
thrill 458 - Wrekmeister Harmonies - The Alone Rush (2018)
thrill 457 - Brother JT - Tornado Juice (2018)
thrill 456 - Yunohana Variations (YoshimiO, Susie Ibarra,  Robert Aiki Aubrey Lowe) - Flower of Sulphur (2018)
thrill 455 - The Skull Defekts - The Skull Defekts (2018)
thrill 454 - Dommengang - Love Jail (2018)
thrill 453 - The Body & Thou - Released From Love / You, Whom I Have Always Hated (2018)
thrill 452 - Tortoise - The Catastrophist Tour Book (2017)
thrill 450 - Jan St. Werner - Spectric Acid (2017)
thrill 447 - The Body & Full of Hell - Ascending a Mountain of Heavy Light (2017)
thrill 446 - Golden Retriever - Rotations (2017)
thrill 444 - House and Land - House and Land (2017)
thrill 443 - Glenn Jones - Against Which The Sea Continually Beats (2017)
thrill 442 - Sidi Touré - Toubalbero (2018)
thrill 441 - Man Forever - Play What They Want (2017)
thrill 440 - White Hills - Stop Mute Defeat (2017)
thrill 439 - Dustin Wong & Takako Minekawa - Are Euphoria (2017)
thrill 438 – Glenn Jones & Matthew Azevedo – Waterworks (2017)
thrill 437 – Trans Am – California Hotel (2016)
thrill 436 – Pontiak – Dialectic of Ignorance (2017)
thrill 435 – Brian Gibson – Thumper (2016)
thrill 434 – Sumac – Before You I Appear (2016)
thrill 433 – Arbouretum – Song of the Rose (2017)
thrill 432 – Entrance – Book of Changes (2017)
thrill 430 – Glenn Jones – This is the Wind that Blows it Out (2017)
thrill 429 – Emptyset – Borders (2017)
thrill 428 – Entrance – Promises (2016)
thrill 427 - Sarah Louise - Deeper Woods (2018)
thrill 424 – Radian – On Dark Silent Off (2016)
thrill 421 – Wrekmeister Harmonies – Light Falls (2016)
thrill 418 – Helen Money – Become Zero (2016)
thrill 417 – Sumac – What One Becomes (2016)
thrill 414 – Rhyton – Redshift (2016)
thrill 413 – Brokeback – Illinois River Valley Blues (2017)
thrill 409 – Thalia Zedek Band – Eve (2016)
thrill 408 – Glenn Jones – Fleeting (2016)
thrill 407 – The Body – No One Deserves Happiness (2016)
thrill 406 – Tortoise – The Catastrophist (2016)
thrill 405 – Dan Friel – Life (2015)
thrill 403 – Wrekmeister Harmonies – Night of Your Ascension (2015)
thrill 401 – Matmos – Ultimate Care II (2016)
thrill 398 – Golden Void – Berkana (2015)
thrill 397 – Holy Sons – Fall of Man (2015)
thrill 395 – Eleventh Dream Day – Works for Tomorrow (2015)
thrill 391 – White Hills – Walks for Motorists (2015)
thrill 389 – Peals – Seltzer (2015)
thrill 387 – Colleen – Captain of None (2015)4
thrill 378 – Liturgy – The Ark Work
thrill 339 – Wrekmeister Harmonies – "You've Always Meant So Much to Me" (2013)
thrill 335 – Peals – Walking Field (2013)
thrill 315 – Matmos – "The Ganzfeld EP" (2012)
thrill 313 – Guardian Alien – "See the World Given to a One Love Entity" (2012)
thrill 286 – High Places – "Original Colors" (2011)
thrill 285 – Future Islands – On the Water (2011)
thrill 284 – Future Islands – "Before the Bridge" b/w "Find Love" 7" (2011)
thrill 283 – Luke Roberts – "Big Bells & Dime Songs" (2011)
thrill 282 – Tunnels – "The Blackout" (2011)
thrill 280 – Barn Owl – Lost in the Glare (2011)
thrill 279 – Wooden Shjips – "West" (2011)
thrill 278 – The Sea and Cake – The Moonlight Butterfly (2011)
thrill 277 – Barn Owl – "Shadowland" (2011)
thrill 276 – White Hills – "H-p1" (2011)
thrill 275 – Pontiak – "Comecrudos" (2011)
thrill 274 – Mountains – "Air Museum" (2011)
thrill 273 – Liturgy – Aesthethica (2011)
thrill 272 – Sorry Bamba – "Volume One 1970–1979" (2011)
thrill 271 – Glenn Jones – "The Wanting" (2011)
thrill 270 – Oval/Liturgy – Split LP (2011)
thrill 269 – Mitchell & Manley – "NorCal Values" (2011)
thrill 268 – Glenn Jones "Even to Win is to Fail" b/w The Black Twig Pickers & Charlie Parr "EastMont Syrup" (2011)
thrill 267 – Zomes – "Earth Grid" (2011)
thrill 266 – Eternal Tapestry & Sun Araw – "Night Gallery" (2011)
thrill 265 – Alexander Tucker – "Dorwytch" (2011)
thrill 264 – D. Charles Speer & The Helix – "Leaving the Commonwealth" (2011)
thrill 263 – D. Charles Speer – "Arghiledes" (2011)
thrill 262 – Matthew Friedberger – "Solos" Subscription Series/Box Set (2011)
thrill 261 – Eleventh Dream Day – "Riot Now" (2011)
thrill 260 – The Skull Defekts – "Peer Amid" (2011)
thrill 259 – Rick Rizzo & Tara Key – "Double Star" (2011)
thrill 258 – Phil Manley – "Life Coach" (2011)
thrill 257 – Arbouretum – "The Gathering" (2011)
thrill 256 – Sidi Touré – "Sahel Folk" (2011)
thrill 255 – Twig Harper & Daniel Higgs – "Clairaudience Fellowship" (2010)
thrill 254 – Koen Holtkamp – "Gravity/Bees" (2010)
thrill 253 – Barn Owl – "Ancestral Star" (2010)
thrill 252 – Eternal Tapestry – "Beyond the 4th Door" (2011)
thrill 251 – Dustin Wong – "Infinite Love" (2010)
thrill 250 – Boredoms – "77 BOA DRUM" DVD (2010)
thrill 249 – The Black Twig Pickers – Ironto Special (2010)
thrill 248 – Sam Prekop – Old Punch Card (2010)
thrill 247 – Coil Sea – "Coil Sea" (2010)
thrill 246 – Fennesz / Daniell / Buck – Knoxville (2010)
thrill 245 – Imbogodom – The Metallic Year (2010)
thrill 244 – Oval – O (2010)
thrill 243 – Thank You – "Golden Worry" (2011)
thrill 242 – Tunng – ...And Then We Saw Land (2010)
thrill 241 – Lazer Crystal – MCMLXXX (2010)
thrill 240 – Daniel Higgs – Say God (2010)
thrill 239 – Double Dagger – Masks (2010)
thrill 238 – High Places – High Places v. Mankind (2010)
thrill 237 – Mi Ami – Steal Your Face (2010)
thrill 236 – Trans Am – Thing (2010)
thrill 235 – Future Islands – In Evening Air (2010)
thrill 234 – Rob A.A. Lowe and Rose Lazar – Eclipses (Limited to 750 copies) (2010)
thrill 233 – Pontiak – Living (2010)
thrill 232 – White Hills – White Hills (2010)
thrill 231 – Pit Er Pat – The Flexible Entertainer (2010)
thrill 230 – Pontiak – Sea Voids (Limited to 1000 vinyl copies)(2009)
thrill 229 – Jack Rose – Luck in the Valley (2010)
thrill 228 – Chicago Underground Duo – Boca Negra (2010)
thrill 227 – Trans Am – What Day is it Tonight? (December 8, 2009)
thrill 226 – Mountains – Etching (Limited to 1000 copies) (2009)
thrill 225 – Jason Urick – Husbands (Limited to 500 copies) (2009)
thrill 224 – Radian – Chimeric (2009)
thrill 223 – Matthew Friedberger – Winter Women / Holy Ghost Language School (2009)
thrill 222 – OOIOO – Armonico Hewa (2009)
thrill 221 – Boredoms – Super Roots 10 (2009)
thrill 220 – The Fiery Furnaces – I'm Going Away (July 1, 2009)
thrill 219 – Lokai – Transition (September, 2009)
thrill 218 – Angela Desveaux – If I Ever Loved 7" (Limited to 500 copies) (2009)
thrill 217 – White Hills – Heads on Fire (2009)
thrill 216 – David Daniell and Douglas McCombs – Sycamore (August 18, 2009)
thrill 215 – Double Dagger – More (May, 2009)
thrill 214 – Extra Golden – Thank You Very Quickly (2009)
thrill 213 – Pontiak – Maker
thrill 212 – Arbouretum – Song of the Pearl (2009)
thrill 211 – Mountains – Choral (2009)(orange and white cover), April 2009 vinyl reissue with brown and white cover
thrill 210 – Tortoise – Beacons of Ancestorship (2009)
thrill 209 – Lithops – Ye Viols! (2009)
thrill 208 – Pit Er Pat – High Time (October, 2008)
thrill 207 – High Places – High Places (September, 2008)
thrill 206 – Pontiak – Sun on Sun (September, 2008)
thrill 205 – The Sea and Cake – Car Alarm (October, 2008)
thrill 204 – High Places – 03/07–09/07 (July, 2008)
thrill 203 – Angela Desveaux – The Mighty Ship (September, 2008)
thrill 202 – The Fiery Furnaces – Remember (August, 2008)
thrill 201 – Arbouretum / Pontiak – Kale split album (July, 2008)
thrill 200 – Various – Plum 7 Inches Box Set
thrill 199 – The Accidental – There Were Wolves
thrill 198 – Thank You – Terrible Two
thrill 197 – Boredoms – Super Roots 9
thrill 196 – Thalia Zedek – Liars and Prayers
thrill 195 – Robert A.A. Lowe & Rose Lazar – Gyromancy
thrill 194 – Nemeth – Film
thrill 193 – School of Language – Sea from Shore
thrill 192 – Bill Dixon with Exploding Star Orchestra – Bill Dixon with Exploding Star Orchestra
thrill 191 – Human Bell – Human Bell
thrill 190 – Tunng – Good Arrows
thrill 189 – The Fiery Furnaces – Widow City
thrill 188 – KTL – 2
thrill 187 – Extra Golden – Hera Ma Nono
thrill 186 – The Sea and Cake – Everybody
thrill 185 – ADULT. – Why Bother?
thrill 184 – Daniel A.I.U. Higgs –  Atomic Yggdrasil Tarot
thrill 183 – Fred Anderson & Hamid Drake – From the River to the Ocean
thrill 182 – Trans Am – Sex Change
thrill 181 – Exploding Star Orchestra – We are all from somewhere else.
thrill 180 – Arbouretum – Rites of Uncovering
thrill 179 – Lithops – Mound Magnet
thrill 178 – The Zincs – Black Pompadour
thrill 177 – Bobby Conn – King For A Day
thrill 176 – Pit er Pat – Covers EP
thrill 175 – Angela Desveaux – Wandering Eyes
thrill 174 – Tom Verlaine – Around
thrill 173 – Tom Verlaine – Songs and Other Things
thrill 172 – Eleventh Dream Day – Zeroes and Ones
thrill 171 – OOIOO – Eye Remix EP
thrill 170 – Califone – Roomsound
thrill 169 – Pit er Pat – 3D Message
thrill 168 – Chicago Underground Duo – In Praise of Shadows
thrill 167 – Howe Gelb – Sno Angel Like You
thrill 166 – Arizona Amp and Alternator – Arizona Amp and Alternator
thrill 165 – Town and Country – Up Above
thrill 164 – Frequency – Frequency
thrill 163 – Califone – Roots & Crowns
thrill 162 – Tom Verlaine – Warm and Cool
thrill 161 – OOIOO – TAIGA
thrill 160 – OOIOO – Gold and Green
thrill 159 – ADULT. – Gimmie Trouble
thrill 158 – Aki Tsuyuko – Hokane
thrill 157 – John Parish – Once Upon A Little Time
thrill 156 – ADULT. – D.U.M.E.
thrill 155 – Bobby Conn – Live Classics Vol. 1
thrill 154 – Pit er Pat – Shakey
thrill 153 – Extra Golden – Ok-Oyot System
thrill 152 – Tortoise – A Lazarus Taxon
thrill 151 – The Zincs – Dimmer
thrill 150 – Freakwater – Thinking of You
thrill 149 – Archer Prewitt – Wilderness
thrill 148 – Thalia Zedek – Trust Not Those in Whom Without Some Touch of Madness
thrill 147 – Radian – Juxtaposition
thrill 146 – Sam Prekop – Who's Your New Professor
thrill 145 – Jimmy Martin – Don't Cry to Me
thrill 144 – Trans Am – Liberation
thrill 143 – The National Trust – Kings and Queens
thrill 142 – Giant Sand – Is All Over... The Map
thrill 141 – Trapist – Ballroom
thrill 140 – Sticks & Stones – Shed Grace
thrill 139 – Fred Anderson & Hamid Drake – Back Together Again
thrill 138 – The Band of Blacky Ranchette – Still Lookin' Good to Me
thrill 137 – Bobby Conn – The Homeland
thrill 136 – Chicago Underground Trio – Slon
thrill 135 – Califone – Heron King Blues
thrill 134 – Mouse On Mars – Radical Connector
thrill 133 – David Byrne – Lead Us Not Into Temptation: Music from the Film Young Adam
thrill 132 – Lithops – Scrypt
thrill 131 – Eleventh Dream Day – Prairie School Freakout / Wayne EP Reissue
thrill 130 – So – So
thrill 129 – Jeff Parker (guitarist) – The Relatives
thrill 128 – Town and Country – 5
thrill 127 – Mouse On Mars – Glam
thrill 126 – The Lonesome Organist – Forms and Follies
thrill 125 – The Sea and Cake – Glass
thrill 124 – Howe Gelb – The Listener
thrill 123 – Nobukazu Takemura – Assembler
thrill 122 – Califone – Quicksand / Cradlesnakes
thrill 121 – Janet Bean and The Concertina Wire – Dragging Wonder Lake
thrill 120 – Brokeback – Looks at the Bird
thrill 119 – Catherine Irwin – Cut Yourself A Switch
thrill 118 – Nobukazu Takemura – 10th
thrill 117 – OOIOO – Kila Kila Kila
thrill 116 – The Sea and Cake – One Bedroom
thrill 115 – Tortoise – It's All Around You
thrill 114 – Town and Country – C'Mon
thrill 113 – Radian – Rec.Extern
thrill 112 – Sue Garner – Shadyside
thrill 111 – The National Trust – Dekkagar
thrill 110 – John Parish – How Animals Move
thrill 109 – Trans Am – TA
thrill 108 – Archer Prewitt – Three
thrill 107 – Trans Champs – Double Exposure
thrill 106 – Chicago Underground Duo – Axis and Alignment
thrill 105 – Nerves – World of Gold
thrill 104 – Giant Sand – Cover Magazine
thrill 103 – Oval – Ovalcommers
thrill 102 – Andrew Coleman – Everything Was Beautiful, and Nothing Hurt
thrill 101 – Fred Anderson and Robert Barry – Duets 2001
thrill 100 – Thrill Jockey DVD – Looking for a Thrill : An Anthology of Inspiration
thrill 099 – All Natural – Second Nature
thrill 098 – Mouse On Mars – Idiology
thrill 097 – Howe Gelb – Confluence
thrill 095 – Mouse On Mars – Instrumentals
thrill 094 – Nobukazu Takemura – Hoshi No Koe
thrill 093 – Chicago Underground Quartet – Chicago Underground Quartet
thrill 092 – Microstoria – Model 3, Step 2
thrill 091 – Brokeback – Morse Code in the Modern Age: Across the Americas
thrill 090 – Pullman – Viewfinder
thrill 089 – Tortoise – Standards
thrill 088 – Town and Country – It all has to do with it.
thrill 087 – Trans Am – Red Line
thrill 086 – The Sea and Cake – Oui
thrill 085 – Eleventh Dream Day – Stalled Parade
thrill 084 – Bobby Conn – The Golden Age
thrill 083 – Town and Country – Decoration Day
thrill 082 – Trans Am – You Can Always Get What You Want
thrill 081 – Oval – Ovalprocess
thrill 080 – Isotope 217 – Who Stole the I Walkman?
thrill 079 – Giant Sand – Chore of Enchantment
thrill 078 – Freakwater – Hellbound/Lorraine
thrill 077 – Chicago Underground Duo – Synesthesia
thrill 076 – Mouse On Mars – Niun Niggung
thrill 075 – Bobby Conn – Llovessongs
thrill 074 – The National Trust – Make It Happen
thrill 073 – David Boykin Outlet – Evidence Of Life On Other Planets Vol. 1
thrill 072 – Rick Rizzo and Tara Key – Dark Edson Tiger
thrill 071 – 8 Bold Souls – Last Option
thrill 070 – Brokeback – Field Recordings From The Cook County Water Table
thrill 069 – Nerves – New Animal
thrill 068 – Nobukazu Takemura – Scope
thrill 067 – The Lonesome Organist – Cavalcade
thrill 066 – Freakwater – End Time
thrill 065 – Sue Garner & Rick Brown – Still
thrill 064 – Oval – Szenariodisk
thrill 063 – Isotope 217 – Utonian Automatic
thrill 062 – Trans Am – Futureworld
thrill 061 – Sam Prekop – Sam Prekop
thrill 060 – Chicago Underground Duo – 12° of Freedom
thrill 057 – Tortoise Madison Avenue/Madison Area Tour 7"
thrill 056 – A Minor Forest – Inindependence
thrill 055 – Pullman Turnstyles and Junkpiles
thrill 054 – Trans Am – The Surveillance
thrill 052 – Nerves – Nerves
thrill 051 – Sue Garner – To Run More Smoothly
thrill 050 – Tortoise – TNT
thrill 049 – Isotope 217 – The Unstable Molecule
thrill 048 – The Sea and Cake – Two Gentlemen
thrill 047 – Freakwater – Springtime
thrill 046 – Oval – Dok
thrill 045 – Mouse On Mars – Autoditacker
thrill 044 – The Lonesome Organist – Collector of Cactus Echo Bags
thrill 042 – Microstoria – Reprovisers
thrill 041 – Brokeback – Returns to the Orange Grove
thrill 040 – Freakwater – Dancing Underwater
thrill 039 – The Sea and Cake – The Fawn
thrill 038 – Trans Am – Surrender to the Night
thrill 037 – Eleventh Dream Day – Eighth
thrill 036 – Oval – 94 diskont
thrill 035 – Microstoria – snd
thrill 034 – A Minor Forest – Flemish Altruism
thrill 033 – Directions – Directions In Music
thrill 032 – Oval – Systemisch
thrill 031 – Microstoria – init ding
thrill 029 – Rome – Rome
thrill 028 – Gaunt – Kryptonite
thrill 026 – The Sea and Cake – The Biz
thrill 025 – Tortoise – Millions Now Living Will Never Die
thrill 024 – Trans Am – Trans Am
thrill 023 – V3 – evil love deeper
thrill 022 – Freakwater – Old Paint
thrill 021 – The Sea and Cake – Nassau
thrill 020 – Dolomite – Easter Someday
thrill 018 – Vitapup – Disbelief / Laxative Cat
thrill 017 – Gaunt – I Can See Your Mom From Here
thrill 016 – The Sea and Cake – The Sea and Cake
thrill 015 – Gaunt – Sob Story
thrill 014 – Sugarshock – Mother Nature
thrill 013 – Tortoise – Tortoise
thrill 012 – Gorilla – Bargain Love
thrill 011 – Dolomite – Acetate/gift Horse
thrill 010 – Freakwater – Feels Like The Third Time
thrill 009 – Freakwater – My Old Drunk Friend (7")
thrill 008 – Gaunt – Pop Song (7")
thrill 007 – Zip Gun – I Can't Wait (7")
thrill 006 – Tortoise – Lonesome Sound (7")
thrill 005 – Gorilla – Stuck on You
thrill 004 – Sugarshock – I Hate the Kids
thrill 003 – Gorilla – Deal With It
thrill 002 – Gaunt – Whitey The Man (10" LP)
thrill 001 – H.P. Zinker – Perseverance
thrill 12.44 – Oval – Oh (2010) (1000 Copies – First Pressing white vinyl)
thrill 12.43 – High Places – Can't Feel Born (2010) (1000 Copies white/blue marble vinyl)
thrill 12.42 – Jack Rose With D. Charles Speer & The Helix – Ragged and Right (2010) (1000 Copies)
thrill 12.41 – Future Islands – In The Fall (2010) (1000 Copies blue translucent vinyl)
thrill 12.40 – Jason Urick – Fussing & Fighting (2010) (500 Copies)
thrill 12.39 – Javelin – 2 (2010)
thrill 12.38 – Mi Ami – Cut Men (2009) (500 Copies)
thrill 12.37 – Javelin – Javelin (2009) (500 Copies)
thrill 12.36 – White Hills – Dead (2009)
thrill 12.35 – Thank You – Pathetic Magic (2009) (300 Copies)
thrill 12.34 – Tortoise – Beacons of Ancestorship Remixes – Eye / Mark Ernestus (2009) (1500 Copies)
thrill 12.33 – Pontiak – Sea Voids (2009) (500 Copies)
thrill 12.32 – The Fiery Furnaces – The End Is Near (2009) (1000 Copies)
thrill 12.31 – Pit Er Pat – High Time Remix (2009) (300 Copies)
thrill 12.30 – Various Artists – Records Toreism (4-18-09 for Record Store Day)
thrill 12.29 – Trey Told 'Em –  Super Epic Thrill Jockey Mega Massive Mix
thrill 12.27 – Gray Market Goods – Soldier of Fortune / We Live in the Future
thrill 12.26 – Trans Am – Extremixxx
thrill 12.25 – Nobukazu Takemura – Mimic Robot
thrill 12.24 – Mouse On Mars – Agit Itter It It
thrill 12.23 – Bobby Conn – Winners
thrill 12.22 – Tortoise – Gently Cupping the Chin of the Ape
thrill 12.21 – Mouse On Mars – Actionist Respoke
thrill 12.20 – Nobukazu Takemura – Sign
thrill 12.19 – Lithops – Fi/Sequenced Twinset
thrill 12.18 – The Eternals – Where Will We Live Now?
thrill 12.17 – Andrew Coleman – Blame It On Adam
thrill 12.16 – The Eternals – Chapter & Verse
thrill 12.15 – Vert – Mewantemoosic (12" LP)
thrill 12.15 – The Eternals – Chapter And Verse (12" LP)
thrill 12.14 – Mouse On Mars – Pickly Dred Rhizzoms
thrill 12.13 – Nobukazu Takemura – Limited (12" LP)
thrill 12.12 – Wang Inc. –  Wang Inc. (12" LP)
thrill 12.11 – Tortoise – Autechre (12" LP)
thrill 12.10 – Tortoise – Derrick Carter (12" LP)
thrill 12.9 – Tortoise – Remixed (CD)
thrill 12.8 – Microstoria – Jim O'Rourke/Violent Onsen Geisha
thrill 12.7 – Microstoria/Ui/Mouse On Mars (12" LP)
thrill 12.6 – Microstoria – Stereolab/Oval
thrill 12.5 – Tortoise – The Taut and Tame
thrill 12.4 – Tortoise – Rivers
thrill 12.3 – Tortoise – Music for Workgroups
thrill 12.2 – Rome – Beware Soul Snatchers
thrill 12.1 – Tortoise – Djed
UR062 – Sima Kim & Wouter Van Veldhoven – Sketches (cassette)
ura 006 – Trans Am – Who Do We Think You Are?
baros1 – Pit er Pat – The Babies Are Tired/Lullaby
OC23 – Pit er Pat – Emergency
BC-041 – Nobukazu Takemura – Songbook
CA-001 – The Zincs – Forty Winks with the Zincs
s-44 – Mouse On Mars – Wipe That Sound
SSF 001 – Jimmy Martin – The Life & Times of Jimmy Martin – Video
DG 543 – Jeff Parker – Like-Coping (cf Delmark)
owom 04 – Howe Gelb – Lull Some Piano
owom 07 – Howe Gelb – Ogle Some Piano
EZ-26 – ADULT. – Anxiety Always
EZ-15 – ADULT. – Resuscitation
EZ-033 – ADULT. / Dirtbombs – Pray for Pills / Lost Love
EZ-028 – ADULT. / Tamion 12 Inch – T & A
T 302 – Bobby Conn – Bobby Conn
T-672 – Bobby Conn – Never Get Ahead
de 558 – Jeff Parker & Scott Fields – Song Songs Song

See also 
 Thrill Jockey

External links
 Official site

Discographies of American record labels
Rock music discographies